My Little Happiness is a 2021 Chinese romantic television series starring Xing Fei, Tang Xiaotian, Huang Yilin and Li Chuan. Directed by Yang Long, it is adapted from the novel You Are My Little Luck by Dong Ben Xi Gu. It premiered on Tencent Video and WeTV on January 13, 2021, until January 27, 2021.

Cast

Main
Xing Fei as Cong Rong
Xu Yixuan as young Cong Rong
Tang Xiaotian as Wen Shaoqing
Huang Yilin as Zhou Chengcheng
Li Chuan as Wen Rang

Supporting
Fu Weilun as Zhong Zhen, Cong Rong's cousin
Liu Chang as Shang Guanyi, Cong Rong's boss
Wang Mohan as Xiong Jing Jing, Cong Rong's colleague
Luo Chenshu as Lucy, Da Ren Law Firm's HR employee
Deng Yuli as Qin Chu, Shaoqing's colleague
Chang Long as Chen Cu, Shaoqing's colleague
Yang Anqi as San Bao, Chen Cu's wife
Sun Letian as Hospital director Yan
Cui Yi as Cong Rong's mother
Pan Shiqi as Jiang Yao, Wen Rang's ex-girlfriend
Wang Bin as Lawyer Tang
Ge Zhaomei as Shaoqing's grandmother
Xu Zhengyun as Shaoqing's grandfather
Liu Pizhong as Shaoqing's father

Others
Zhang Yuanyuan as Lawyer Xu (Da Ren Law Firm)
Stephen Guo as Cheng Cheng's friend
Liu Weilong as Xiao Lu, Cheng Cheng ex-boyfriend
Zhang Han as Cheng Cheng's mother
Gao Guo as Cheng Cheng's father
Wang Qing as Zhong Zhen's mother
Sandy Yu as Shaoqing's mother
Gong Jinguo as Uncle Lin, Shaoqing's patient
Xu Mingzhe as Uncle Lin's godson
Chen Yilan as Wen Qing, Cong Rong and Shaoqing's daughter

Production
The film crew officially launched in Shenzhen on January 6, 2020.

The drama serves as a reunion project for Xing Fei and Tang Xiaotian who both starred in the 2019 drama Put Your Head on My Shoulder. This drama also reunites Tang Xiaotian and Huang Yilin who worked together in Bureau of Transformer.

Soundtrack

References

External links

2021 Chinese television series debuts
2021 Chinese television series endings
Chinese romantic comedy television series
Television shows based on Chinese novels
Tencent original programming
Television series by Tencent Penguin Pictures